The Wilburton Trestle is a historic wooden railway trestle in Bellevue, Washington.

The trestle carried a single track of a former Northern Pacific branch line over a valley that used to be an extension of Lake Washington. Before the abandonment of the rail line by BNSF, freight trains ran six days a week, including those carrying Boeing's aircraft fuselages to its assembly plant in Renton. It was also used daily by the popular Spirit of Washington Dinner Train, but this service ceased at the end of June 2007.

The trestle was originally completed in 1904 as part of the Northern Pacific Railway's Lake Washington Belt Line from Black River Junction (south of Seattle) to Woodinville. It was subsequently rebuilt four separate times, in 1913, 1924, 1934, and 1943, due to deterioration of the timber. In 1973, a road, the Lake Hills Connector, was cut through the trestle, replacing a short section with concrete piers and steel deck girders.

Wilburton Trestle saw its last regularly scheduled daily-except-Sunday passenger trains (Northern Pacific Nos. 445-446) on July 19, 1922.  The train schedule was ended during a national railway strike and never resumed. Several Casey Jones excursion trains crossed the trestle in the 1950s and 1960s.  The Spirit of Washington dinner train operated between Renton and Woodinville from May 1992 to July 31, 2007.  The last train over the trestle was a BNSF freight carrying Boeing 737 fuselages to Renton, on February 26, 2008.  In May 2008 BNSF sold the railway line to the Port of Seattle, which in turn later sold it to King County.

The trestle is a distinctive landmark noticed by travelers on Interstate 405 through Bellevue. While it is believed that this is the trestle pictured in the 1963 Elvis Presley movie It Happened at the World's Fair, further evidence indicates that that trestle was over the White River between Enumclaw and Buckley.

Wilburton Trestle should not be confused with Wilburton Tunnel, which was a tunnel for the southbound lanes of I-405 under the railroad. The tunnel was located about a quarter mile south of the trestle prior to its demolition on August 16, 2008 for freeway improvement and widening.

The trestle is planned to be rehabilitated with deck repairs and seismic upgrades to prepare for its use on the Eastrail pedestrian and bicycle trail network. The trail section is planned to open by 2026 and is estimated to cost $7.5 million, to be funded by a grant from Amazon.

References

External links

Virtual Tour of Wilburton Trestle at VR Seattle (requires QuickTime)

Bridges in King County, Washington
Railroad bridges in Washington (state)
Bridges completed in 1904
Buildings and structures in Bellevue, Washington
Wooden bridges in the United States
Trestle bridges in the United States